The 2015 Ice Challenge was a senior international figure skating competition held in late October 2015 at the Liebenauer Eishalle in Graz, Austria. It was part of the 2015–16 ISU Challenger Series. Medals were awarded in the disciplines of men's singles, ladies' singles, pair skating, and ice dancing.

Entries
The preliminary entries were published on 6 October 2015.

Results: Challenger Series

Medal summary

Men

Ladies

Pairs

Ice dancing

Results: Leo Scheu Memorial

Medal summary: Junior

Medal summary: Advanced novice

References

External links
 
 2015 Ice Challenge results, 2015 Leo Scheu Memorial results 
 2015 Ice Challenge at the International Skating Union

Ice Challenge
Ice Challenge, 2015
Ice Challenge